Lawrence Brent Boggs (born December 18, 1955) is an American politician and a former Democratic member of the West Virginia House of Delegates, representing District 34 from December 1996 to December 2022.

Education
Boggs earned his AS from Glenville State College.

Elections
2012 Boggs was unopposed for both the May 8, 2012 Democratic Primary, winning with 3,110 votes, and the November 6, 2012 General election, winning with 4,741 votes.
1996 Boggs was initially elected to the District 34 seat in the 1996 Democratic Primary and the November 5, 1996 General election.
1998 Boggs was challenged in the 1998 Democratic Primary and won the November 3, 1998 General election against Republican nominee Alfred Lipps.
2000 Boggs was unopposed for the 2000 Democratic Primary and won the November 7, 2000 General election against Republican nominee Joseph Brannon.
2002 Boggs was unopposed for both the 2002 Democratic Primary and the November 5, 2002 General election.
2004 Boggs was unopposed for the 2004 Democratic Primary and won the November 2, 2004 General election against Republican nominee Bradley Shingler.
2006 Boggs was unopposed for both the 2006 Democratic Primary and the November 7, 2006 General election.
2008 Boggs was unopposed for the May 13, 2008 Democratic Primary, winning with 4,504 votes, and won the November 4, 2008 General election with 5,206 votes (83.4%) against Republican nominee Larry Bright.
2010 Boggs was unopposed for both the May 11, 2010 Democratic Primary, winning with 2,773 votes, and the November 2, 2010 General election, winning with 4,131 votes.

References

External links
Official page at the West Virginia Legislature

Brent Boggs at Ballotpedia
Brent Boggs at OpenSecrets

1955 births
Living people
Glenville State College alumni
Democratic Party members of the West Virginia House of Delegates
People from Gassaway, West Virginia
Politicians from Fairmont, West Virginia
21st-century American politicians